Qu Yunxia (born 25 December 1972 in Dalian) is a Chinese Olympic athlete who specialized in the 1500 metres.

At the 1992 Summer Olympics in Barcelona she won a bronze medal in 1500 m.

On 9 November 1993 she set the world record in the 1500 metres at 3:50.46 minutes while running in the National Games of China in Beijing. The record stood 22 years, until broken on 17 July 2015, by Genzebe Dibaba who was the only non-Chinese athlete to seriously challenge the mark during that period.

She won the 3000 metres at the 1993 World Championships in Athletics, setting what will likely be the permanent Championship Record in the event due to women switching to the 5,000 metres distance beginning in 1995.

See also
China at the World Championships in Athletics

References

1972 births
Living people
Runners from Liaoning
Chinese female long-distance runners
Chinese female middle-distance runners
Olympic athletes of China
Olympic bronze medalists for China
Athletes (track and field) at the 1992 Summer Olympics
World record setters in athletics (track and field)
Asian Games gold medalists for China
Asian Games medalists in athletics (track and field)
Athletes (track and field) at the 1994 Asian Games
World Athletics Championships athletes for China
World Athletics Championships medalists
Medalists at the 1992 Summer Olympics
Olympic bronze medalists in athletics (track and field)
Universiade medalists in athletics (track and field)
Medalists at the 1994 Asian Games
Universiade bronze medalists for China
Athletes from Dalian
World Athletics Championships winners
Medalists at the 1991 Summer Universiade